Lyle J. Koenen (born June 16, 1956) is a Minnesota politician and former member of the Minnesota Senate. A member of the Minnesota Democratic–Farmer–Labor Party (DFL), he represented District 17, which included portions of Chippewa, Kandiyohi, Renville, and Swift counties in the southwestern part of the state.

Early life, education, and career
Koenen attended Maynard High School in Maynard, then Willmar Technical College in Willmar, earning his A.A. in agriculture. He has worked as a dairy farmer and was also a milk truck and school bus driver. He has co-chaired the Chippewa County National Farmers Union since 1996.

Minnesota House of Representatives
Koenen was first elected in 2002, and was reelected four times. He chaired the House Agriculture, Rural Economies and Veterans Affairs subcommittee for the Veterans Affairs Division. On May 21, 2011, he was one of two DFL representatives who voted with a majority of Republicans to send a constitutional ban on same-sex marriage to a 2012 referendum.

Minnesota Senate
Koenen was elected to the Senate in a special election in 2012 to fill the seat left vacant after the death of Gary Kubly. He was sworn in on April 18, 2012. Koenen ran for reelection to the newly drawn District 17 in 2012, defeating incumbent Willmar Republican Joseph Gimse. He lost reelection to Republican Andrew Lang.

References

External links

 Minnesota Public Radio Votetracker: Rep. Lyle Koenen
 Project Votesmart - Rep. Lyle Koenen Profile

1956 births
Living people
People from Chippewa County, Minnesota
Democratic Party members of the Minnesota House of Representatives
Democratic Party Minnesota state senators
21st-century American politicians